WSJX-LP, UHF analog channel 24, was a low-powered LATV-affiliated television station licensed to Aguadilla, Puerto Rico. The station was owned by Caribbean Broadcasting Network along with sister station WSJP-LD (channel 18).

History
The station had been silent in January 2014. From that point until the Fox affiliation ended, it continued broadcasting on channel 18.2 of sister station WSJP-LD.

On January 1, 2016, and after two years off the air, WSJX-LP resumed broadcasting and becomes an affiliate of the LATV network.

WSJX-LP broadcast the entire LATV schedule with Shop LC paid programming overnights.

The station had been silent since November 1, 2020. Caribbean Broadcasting Network surrendered WSJX-LP's license to the Federal Communications Commission for cancellation on January 14, 2021. The LATV affiliation has been moved to the fifth subchannel of WSJP-LD.

External links
Caribbean Broadcasting Network

Aguadilla, Puerto Rico
SJX-LP
Television channels and stations established in 2005
2005 establishments in Puerto Rico
Television channels and stations disestablished in 2021
2021 disestablishments in Puerto Rico
SJX-LP
Low-power television stations in the United States